CyRide is a partnership between Iowa State University, the ISU Student Government, and Ames, Iowa. CyRide provides public transportation to the community throughout the city of Ames. The word CyRide is a portmanteau of two words: Cy (which is the mascot of the Iowa State Cyclones) and the word ride.  In January 2012, CyRide was recognized "as the nation’s small urban transit system with the highest number of rides per capita" at 106 rides per capita.

History
From the 1860s until the early 1890 college students were taxied to and from campus by a horse-drawn carriage that was operated by brothers, Nichols and Maxwell Livery. The town committee published a report on November 1, 1890 stating that there would be a benefit to create a railroad to replace the current system.

On July 4, 1892, the rail line, named the dinkey (given by the size of the engine) departed from its barn on the east end of 5th street, for its first  trip to the Iowa State University campus.  The dinkey ran on 30 lb/yd (15 kg/m) rail; that is small compared to the 136 lb/yd (67 kg/m) rail that is used today. The dinkey had three passenger cars that were often at maximum capacity because of the growing population of the city.

In 1929, the dinkey was replaced by a bus system that transported passengers to and from the Iowa State University. In 1976 all operating buses were combined and CyRide was started as a city department. In 1981 Bob Bourne was the director of CyRide. He brought CyRide from a 12 bus, 3 route system to a 65 bus, 11 route system in his 25 years of employment at CyRide.

Routes

Fares
Iowa State Students
Undergraduate students of Iowa State University are able to ride CyRide without paying the normal fare by presenting the bus driver with their Iowa State identification card.  This is necessary on all bus routes except the 21 Cardinal, 23 Orange and 25 Gold Routes which always allow passengers to travel without charge.  Iowa State University charges a fee each semester to all undergraduate students for CyRide service.  This student fee is paid to CyRide to subsidize the cost of operations.

Reduced Fare Riders
To qualify for reduced fare, you must be a student in grades K-12, a senior citizen, or a person with a disability. The reduced Fare is US$0.50 for a one way trip.  Multiple tickets can be purchased at a time, if a ticket book is purchased in advance. Reduced fare ticket books come in a packet of 10 which cost US$5. Ticket books can be bought at local grocery stores, Ames City Hall, and CyRide headquarters.

Full Fare Riders
Full Fare Riders covers everyone else who is riding. The regular fare is US$1.00. Full fare riders can also purchase multiple tickets in advance. Ticket books come in a packet of 10 which cost US$10. Ticket books can also be bought at local grocery stores, Ames City Hall, and CyRide headquarters.

Children Under Five
Children under the age of five are free with an accompanying adult. There may be no more than three children per adult.

Additional Services

Moonlight Express
In 1984, Cyride started to operate a Friday and Saturday nights service called NightRide. The service was inadequately funded, leading to its cancellation in 1992. It returned as Moonlight Express in 1993, and has been dubbed "the drunk bus" by students. This system was put into service to allow students to socialize with their friends while offering a safe alternative to driving while impaired. Between the hours of 10:30 pm to 2:30 am the moonlight express will stop at any stop along a moonlight route.

In the time Moonlight Express has been running, there have been no drunk-driving fatalities in Ames during its hours of operation.

Dial-A-Ride
Dial-A-Ride is a door-to-door service that caters mostly to elderly and disabled persons. This service take people within ¾ mile from any fixed Cyride route. A Dial-A-Ride rides need to be scheduled the day before to ensure a spot. In 2005 Dial-A-Ride was turned over to the Heart of Iowa Regional Transit Authority (HIRTA) which is operated out of the Heartland Senior Services site in the Ames area.

Equipment

CyRide currently operates a variety of different transit buses. Much of CyRide's fleet consists of 40 foot buses but there are six 62 foot articulated buses used in high-capacity service and several small buses used for lower-capacity services. The majority of CyRide's 40 foot bus fleet was manufactured by Gillig while the remaining 40 foot bus fleet was manufactured by Orion. CyRide maintained a few GM New Look 40 foot buses for training purposes but none currently remain on the active fleet list. The 62 foot articulated buses were manufactured by Nova Bus. Much of the current fleet can be referenced in the table below.

Future
CyRide is considering bringing a "fare-free" system to all Ames residents. CyRide currently receives 270,000 dollars from paid fares that will have to be compensated for some other way

In 2009 CyRide was one of 42 applicants to receive a TIGER grant through the Federal Transit Administration. This allowed them to purchase 12 new Hybrid buses at a cost of $6 million. The new buses - dubbed 'Cybrids' - will get an estimated 6 mpg. The current fleet averages about 4.5 mpg fuel efficiency.

Awards
2018 State Bus Roadeo Winner in small bus division
2017 State Bus Roadeo Winners in both large and small bus divisions
26 State Bus Roadeo Winners (as of June 2016)
2015 State Bus Roadeo Winner in large bus division
5th place in the 35' bus division at the 2007 APTA International Bus Roadeo
2nd place in the 35' bus division at the 2004 APTA International Bus Roadeo
2002 APTA Gold Safety Award Finalist
1999 APTA Neil E. Goldschmidt Silver Safety Award Finalist
1997 APTA Neil E. Goldschmidt Silver Safety Award Winner
1996 APTA AdWheels Award Winner
1995 APTA Neil E. Goldschmidt Silver Safety Award Winner
1993 APTA Neil E. Goldschmidt Silver Safety Award Finalist
1992 Public Risk Management Administration Achievement Award
1991 APTA Neil E. Goldschmidt Silver Safety Award Finalist
1989 UMTA Outstanding Public Service Award
1989 UMTA Administrator's Award
1983 All America City Award

Fixed Route Ridership

The ridership and service statistics shown here are of fixed route services only and do not include demand response. Per capita statistics are based on the Ames urbanized area as reported in NTD data. Starting in 2011, 2010 census numbers replace the 2000 census numbers to calculate per capita statistics.

See also
 List of bus transit systems in the United States
 List of intercity bus stops in Iowa

References

Bus transportation in Iowa
Iowa State University
University and college bus systems
1976 establishments in Iowa